Riopa lineata, the lined writhing skink or lined supple skink, is a species of writhing skink. It is known from India (the northern Western Ghats), Bangladesh and Myanmar (= Burma). This skink grows to about 6 cm in length. The body colouration is golden and each scale has a black dot forming longitudinal stripes on the body. It is known to occur from Gujarat to north of Karnataka. In Mumbai this skink has been observed in the Sanjay Gandhi National Park and Aarey milk colony. It is often found under rocks, loose soil associated with termite mounds and ant hills. It is crepuscular. A captive individual accepted termites, mosquito, house flies, ant eggs for about 45 days and was released.

References

 Gray, J.E. 1839 Catalogue of the slender-tongued saurians, with descriptions of many new genera and species. Ann. Mag. Nat. Hist.  (1) 2: 331-337 (287-293)
 Naik Y M; Vinod K R 1994 Record of a rare skink Lygosoma lineata (Gray, 1839) from Kevadia, Gujarat. J. Bombay Nat. Hist. Soc. 91 (2): 324–325.
 Narasimmarajan, K. and Subhasis Mahato 2013. First record of the Lygosoma lineata (Grey 1839) from Melghat Tiger Reserve, Maharashtra. Reptile Rap. 15. 9–10.

Riopa
Reptiles described in 1839
Taxa named by John Edward Gray
Taxobox binomials not recognized by IUCN